Mass spectrometry imaging (MSI) is a technique used in mass spectrometry to visualize the spatial distribution of molecules, as biomarkers, metabolites, peptides or proteins by their molecular masses. After collecting a mass spectrum at one spot, the sample is moved to reach another region, and so on, until the entire sample is scanned. By choosing a peak in the resulting spectra that corresponds to the compound of interest, the MS data is used to map its distribution across the sample. This results in pictures of the spatially resolved distribution of a compound pixel by pixel. Each data set contains a veritable gallery of pictures because any peak in each spectrum can be spatially mapped. Despite the fact that MSI has been generally considered a qualitative method,  the signal generated by this technique is proportional to the relative abundance of the analyte. Therefore, quantification is possible, when its challenges are overcome. Although widely used traditional methodologies like radiochemistry and immunohistochemistry achieve the same goal as MSI, they are limited in their abilities to analyze multiple samples at once, and can prove to be lacking if researchers do not have prior knowledge of the samples being studied. Most common ionization technologies in the field of MSI are DESI imaging,  MALDI imaging and secondary ion mass spectrometry imaging (SIMS imaging).

History 
More than 50 years ago, MSI was introduced using secondary ion mass spectrometry (SIMS) to study semiconductor surfaces by Castaing and Slodzian. However, it was the pioneering work of Richard Caprioli and colleagues in the late 1990s, demonstrating how matrix-assisted laser desorption/ionization (MALDI) could be applied to visualize large biomolecules (as proteins and lipids) in cells and tissue to reveal the function of these molecules and how function is changed by diseases like cancer, which led to the widespread use of MSI. Nowadays, different ionization techniques have been used, including SIMS, MALDI and desorption electrospray ionization (DESI), as well as other technologies. Still, MALDI is the current dominant technology with regard to clinical and biological applications of MSI.

Operation principle 
The MSI is based on the spatial distribution of the sample. Therefore, the operation principle depends on the technique that is used to obtain the spatial information. The two techniques used in MSI are: microprobe and microscope.

Microprobe 
This technique is performed using a focused ionization beam to analyze a specific region of the sample by generating a mass spectrum. The mass spectrum is stored along with the spatial coordination where the measurement took place. Then, a new region is selected and analyzed by moving the sample or the ionization beam. These steps are repeated until the entire sample has been scanned. By coupling all individual mass spectra, a distribution map of intensities as a function of x and y locations can be plotted. As a result, reconstructed molecular images of the sample are obtained.

Microscope 
In this technique, a 2D position-sensitive detector is used to measure the spatial origin of the ions generated at the sample surface by the ion optics of the instruments. The resolution of the spatial information will depend on the magnification of the microscope, the quality of the ions optics and the sensitivity of the detector. A new region still needs to be scanned, but the number of positions drastically reduces. The limitation of this mode is the finite depth of vision present with all microscopes.

Ion source dependence 

The ionization techniques available for MSI are suited to different applications. Some of the criteria for choosing the ionization method are the sample preparation requirement and the parameters of the measurement, as resolution, mass range and sensitivity.  Based on that, the most common used ionization method are MALDI, SIMS AND DESI which are described below. Still, other minor techniques used are laser ablation electrospray ionization (LAESI), laser-ablation-inductively coupled plasma (LA-ICP) and nanospray desorption electrospray ionization (nano-DESI).

SIMS imaging 
Secondary ion mass spectrometry (SIMS) is used to analyze solid surfaces and thin films by sputtering the surface with a focused primary ion beam and collecting and analyzing ejected secondary ions. There are many different sources for a primary ion beam. However, the primary ion beam must contain ions that are at the higher end of the energy scale. Some common sources are: Cs+, O2+, O, Ar+ and Ga+. SIMS imaging is performed in a manner similar to electron microscopy; the primary ion beam is emitted across the sample while secondary mass spectra are recorded. SIMS proves to be advantageous in providing the highest image resolution but only over small area of samples. More, this technique is widely regarded as one of the most sensitive forms of mass spectrometry as it can detect elements in concentrations as small as 1012-1016 atoms per cubic centimeter.

Multiplexed ion beam imaging (MIBI) is a SIMS method that uses metal isotope labeled antibodies to label compounds in biological samples.

Developments within SIMS: Some chemical modifications have been made within SIMS to increase the efficiency of the process. There are currently two separate techniques being used to help increase the overall efficiency by increasing the sensitivity of SIMS measurements: matrix-enhanced SIMS (ME-SIMS) - This has the same sample preparation as MALDI does as this simulates the chemical ionization properties of MALDI. ME-SIMS does not sample nearly as much material. However, if the analyte being tested has a low mass value then it can produce a similar looking spectra to that of a MALDI spectra. ME-SIMS has been so effective that it has been able to detect low mass chemicals at sub cellular levels that was not possible prior to the development of  the ME-SIMS technique. The second technique being used is called sample metallization (Meta-SIMS) - This is the process of gold or silver addition to the sample. This forms a layer of gold or silver around the sample and it is normally no more than 1-3 nm thick. Using this technique has resulted in an increase of sensitivity for larger mass samples. The addition of the metallic layer also allows for the conversion of insulating samples to conducting samples, thus charge compensation within SIMS experiments is no longer required.

MALDI imaging 

Matrix-assisted laser desorption ionization can be used as a mass spectrometry imaging technique for relatively large molecules. It has recently been shown that the most effective type of matrix to use is an ionic matrix for MALDI imaging of tissue. In this version of the technique the sample, typically a thin tissue section, is moved in two dimensions while the mass spectrum is recorded. Although MALDI has the benefit of being able to record the spatial distribution of larger molecules, it comes at the cost of lower resolution than the SIMS technique. The limit for the lateral resolution for most of the modern instruments using MALDI is 20 m. MALDI experiments commonly use either an Nd:YAG (355 nm) or N2 (337 nm) laser for ionization.

Pharmacodynamics and toxicodynamics in tissue have been studied by MALDI imaging.

DESI imaging 
Desorption electrospray Ionization is a less destructive technique, which couples simplicity and rapid analysis of the sample. The sample is sprayed with an electrically charged solvent mist at an angle that causes the ionization and desorption of various molecular species. Then, two-dimensional maps of the abundance of the selected ions in the surface of the sample in relation with the spatial distribution are generated. This technique is applicable to solid, liquid, frozen and gaseous samples. Moreover, DESI allows analyzing a wide range of organic and biological compounds, as animal and plant tissues and cell culture samples, without complex sample preparation Although, this technique has the poorest resolution among other, it can create high-quality image from a large area scan, as a whole body section scanning. Fn

Comparative between the ionization techniques

Combination of various MSI techniques and other imaging techniques 
Combining various MSI techniques can be beneficial, since each particular technique has its own advantage. For example, when information regards both proteins and lipids are necessary in the same tissue section, performing DESI to analyze the lipid, followed by MALDI to obtain information about the peptide, and finalize applying a stain (haematoxylin and eosin) for medical diagnosis of the structural characteristic of the tissue. On the other side of MSI with other imaging techniques, fluorescence staining with MSI and magnetic resonance imaging (MRI)  with MRI can be highlighted.  Fluorescence staining can give information of the appearance of some proteins present in any process inside a tissue, while MSI may give information about the molecular changes presented in that process. Combining both techniques, multimodal picture or even 3D images of the distribution of different molecules can be generated. In contrast, MRI with MSI combines the continuous 3D representation of MRI image with detailed structural representation using molecular information from MSI. Even though, MSI itself can generate 3D images, the picture is just part of the reality due to the depth limitation in the analysis, while MRI provides, for example, detailed organ shape with additional anatomical information. This coupled technique can be beneficial for cancer precise diagnosis and neurosurgery.

Data processing

Standard data format for mass spectrometry imaging datasets 
The imzML was proposed to exchange data in a standardized XML file based on the mzML format. Several imaging MS software tools support it. The advantage of this format is the flexibility to exchange data between different instruments and data analysis software.

Software 
There are many free software packages available for visualization and mining of imaging mass spectrometry data. Converters from Thermo Fisher format, Analyze format, GRD format and Bruker format to imzML format were developed by the Computis project. Some software modules are also available for viewing mass spectrometry images in imzML format: Biomap (Novartis, free), Datacube Explorer (AMOLF, free), EasyMSI (CEA), Mirion (JLU), MSiReader (NCSU, free) and SpectralAnalysis.

For processing .imzML files with the free statistical and graphics language R, a collection of R scripts is available, which permits parallel-processing of large files on a local computer, a remote cluster or on the Amazon cloud.

Another free statistical package for processing imzML and Analyze 7.5 data in R exists, Cardinal.

SPUTNIK  is an R package containing various filters to remove peaks characterized by an uncorrelated spatial distribution with the sample location or spatial randomness.

Applications 
A remarkable ability of MSI is to find out the localization of biomolecules in tissues, even though there are no previous information about them. This feature has made MSI a unique tool for clinical research and pharmacological research. It provides information about biomolecular changes related with diseases by tracking proteins, lipids, and cell metabolism. For example, identifying biomakers by MSI can show detailed cancer diagnosis. In addition, low cost imaging for pharmaceuticals studies can be acquired, such as images of molecular signatures that would be indicative of treatment response for a specific drug or the effectiveness of a particular drug delivery method.

Ion colocalization has been studied as a way to infer local interactions between biomolecules. Similarly to colocalization in microscopy imaging, correlation has been used to quantify the similarity between ion images and generate network models.

Advantages, challenges and limitations  
The main advantage of MSI for studying the molecules location and distribution within the tissue is that this analysis can provide either greater selectivity, more information or more accuracy than others. Moreover, this tool requires less investment of time and resources for similar results. The table below shows a comparison of advantages and disadvantages of some available techniques, including MSI, correlated with drug distribution analysis.

Notes

Further reading
"Imaging Trace Metals in Biological Systems" pp 81-134 in "Metals, Microbes and Minerals: The Biogeochemical Side of Life" (2021) pp xiv + 341. Authors Yu, Jyao; Harankhedkar, Shefali; Nabatilan, Arielle; Fahrni, Christopher; Walter de Gruyter, Berlin.
Editors Kroneck, Peter M.H. and Sosa Torres, Martha.
DOI 10.1515/9783110589771-004

References 

Mass spectrometry